Highwood is a   Local Nature Reserve in Woodley, west of Wokingham in Berkshire. It is owned by Wokingham Borough Council and managed by the council together with The Friends of Highwood.

Geography and site

The nature reserve is mixed lowland woodland with a heathland area. The site also features examples of exotic tree species which were part of an arboretum in the grounds of what was Woodley Lodge.

History

Highwood used to form part of the grounds of Woodley Lodge.

Fauna

The site has the following fauna:

Birds

Common merganser
Common pochard
Northern shoveler
Grey heron
Grey wagtail
Eurasian treecreeper
Great spotted woodpecker
Common kingfisher

Flora

The site has the following flora:

Trees

Araucaria araucana
Sequoiadendron giganteum

References

Local Nature Reserves in Berkshire